Tărtășești is a commune in the Dâmbovița County, Muntenia, Romania, located  northwest of Bucharest. It has a population of 5,121. It is composed of three villages: Bâldana, Gulia and Tărtășești.

The Bucharest-Târgoviște National Road passes through this locality. In the last years (mainly after 2000), Tărtășești knew a notable development, becoming one of the most important communes near Bucharest (mostly because of modernization of the roads, introducing the gas network and expanding the Bucharest metropolitan area, which brought the Romanian capital to a very short distance - 15 km). The most common activity the people is agriculture, but there are also a few industrial facilities - bread factory, food processing facility, storage facilities, etc.

Natives
Gregorian Bivolaru, yoga teacher

References

Communes in Dâmbovița County
Localities in Muntenia